The 2018–19 Al Ittihad season was the 104th season in the football club's history and 49th consecutive and 58th overall season in the top flight of Egyptian football, the Egyptian Premier League, having been promoted from the Egyptian Second Division in 1961. In addition to the domestic league, Al Ittihad also competed in this season's editions of the domestic cup, the Egypt Cup, and the first-tier Arab cup, the Arab Club Champions Cup. The season covered a period from 1 July 2018 to 30 June 2019; however Al Ittihad played their first match of the season in May 2018 and played their last match in September 2019.

Kit information
Supplier: Uhlsport

Players

Current squad

Out on loan

Transfers

Transfers in

Loans in

Transfers out

Loans out

Friendly matches

Competitions

Overview

Egyptian Premier League

League table

Results summary

Results by round

Matches

Egypt Cup

Arab Club Champions Cup

Group B

First round

Second round

Quarter-finals

Statistics

Appearances and goals

! colspan="11" style="background:#DCDCDC; text-align:center" | Players joined during the 2019 summer transfer window
|-

! colspan="11" style="background:#DCDCDC; text-align:center" | Players transferred out during the season
|-

|}

Goalscorers

Clean sheets

References

Notes

Al Ittihad Alexandria Club seasons
Ittihad